is a Japanese footballer currently playing as a centre back for Kawasaki Frontale.

Club career
Takai was promoted to the Kawasaki Frontale first team ahead of the 2022 season. He made his debut in a 8–0 win over Guangzhou.

Career statistics

Club
:

Notes

References

2004 births
Living people
Sportspeople from Yokohama
Association football people from Kanagawa Prefecture
Japanese footballers
Japan youth international footballers
Association football defenders
Kawasaki Frontale players